Aleksandar Ćirić (born 30 December 1977 in Belgrade) is a Serbian retired water polo player and current head coach of European powerhouse Olympiacos Women's Water Polo Team, who played for two Olympic bronze medal squads, one for FR Yugoslavia at the 2000 Olympics in Sydney, the other for Serbia at the 2008 Olympics in Beijing, and one Olympic silver medal squad for Serbia and Montenegro at the 2004 Olympics in Athens. His most notable achievements during his club career are: winning the Euroleague with VK Bečej in 2000, when he gained the title of MVP of competition; and four LEN Cups, three with Brescia and one with VK Radnički Kragujevac.

Club career
In July 2007. Aleksandar Ćirić became a new member of the Montenegrin premier league team Budvanska Rivijera. As stated by the Podgorica daily paper "Vijesti" Ćirić signed a two-year contract with Budva, who wanted to challenge Primorac, the champion of Montenegro and Jadran from Herceg Novi.

In June 2010. Ćirić signed a two-year contract with the Spanish Barceloneta. He played last season for Budva. "It is a mutual satisfaction and I signed a two-year contract with Barceloneta. In an interview with the leaders of the club, I saw that the ambitions are high. Aim is to defend the double crown in Spain, and to get as far as possible in the Euroleague." Ćirić said in a statement. He is currently playing for ENKA Istanbul (TUR).

Clubs he played for
 –1994 Crvena Zvezda Jupeks
 1994–2001 VK Bečej Naftagas
 2001–2007 AN Brescia
 2007–2010 VK Budva
 2010–2012 Barceloneta
 2012–2013 VK Radnički Kragujevac
 2013– ENKA Istanbul (TUR)

Honours

Club
VK Crvena Zvezda
 National Championship of Yugoslavia (1): 1992–93
VK Bečej Naftagas
 National Championship of Yugoslavia (6): 1995–96, 1996–97, 1997–98, 1998–99, 1999–2000, 2000–01
 National Cup of Yugoslavia (6): 1995–96, 1996–97, 1997–98, 1998–99, 1999–2000, 2000–01
 LEN Euroleague (1):  1999–2000
AN Brescia
 Serie A1 (1): 2002–03
 LEN Cup (3): 2001–02, 2002–03, 2005–06
PVK Budva
 Montenegrin Water Polo Cup (1): 2007–08
CN Atlètic-Barceloneta
 División de Honor (1): 2010–11
 Supercopa de España (1): 2010–11
VK Radnički Kragujevac
 LEN Trophy (1): 2012–13

Individual
 LEN Euroleague MVP (1): 1999–2000

See also
 Serbia men's Olympic water polo team records and statistics
 Serbia and Montenegro men's Olympic water polo team records and statistics
 List of Olympic medalists in water polo (men)
 List of World Aquatics Championships medalists in water polo

References

External links
 
 
 

1977 births
Living people
Sportspeople from Belgrade
Yugoslav male water polo players
Serbia and Montenegro male water polo players
Serbian male water polo players
Water polo drivers
Water polo players at the 2000 Summer Olympics
Water polo players at the 2004 Summer Olympics
Water polo players at the 2008 Summer Olympics
Medalists at the 2000 Summer Olympics
Medalists at the 2004 Summer Olympics
Medalists at the 2008 Summer Olympics
Olympic water polo players of Yugoslavia
Olympic water polo players of Serbia and Montenegro
Olympic bronze medalists for Federal Republic of Yugoslavia
Olympic silver medalists for Serbia and Montenegro
Olympic bronze medalists for Serbia in water polo
World Aquatics Championships medalists in water polo
European champions for Serbia
Competitors at the 1997 Mediterranean Games
Olympiacos Women's Water Polo Team coaches
Mediterranean Games medalists in water polo
Mediterranean Games gold medalists for Yugoslavia
Universiade medalists in water polo
Universiade gold medalists for Serbia and Montenegro
Medalists at the 1995 Summer Universiade